André Luguet (15 May 1892 – 24 May 1979) was a French stage and film actor. He appeared in more than 120 films between 1910 and 1970. He was born in Fontenay-sous-Bois, France, and died in Cannes, France. His daughter Rosine Luguet became an actress.

Partial filmography

 Parisian Pleasures (1927)
 The Mad Genius (1931)
 Gloria (1931)
 American Love (1931)
 The Man Who Played God (1932)
 High Pressure (1932)
 Jewel Robbery (1932)
 Jenny Lind (1932)
 A Weak Woman (1933)
 Once Upon a Time (1933)
 Jeanne (1934)
 Samson (1936)
 Girls in Distress (1939)
 Thunder Over Paris (1940)
 Beating Heart (1940)
 The Last of the Six (1941)
  Bolero (1942)
 Arlette and Love (1943)
 Mademoiselle Béatrice (1943)
 The Inevitable Monsieur Dubois (1943)
 Mademoiselle X (1945)
Farandole (1945)
 Six Hours to Lose (1946)
 Happy Lucky (1946)
 The Father of the Girl (1953)
 The Lovers of Marianne (1953)
 The Two Orphans (1954)
 Madame du Barry (1954)
 The French, They Are a Funny Race (1955)
 It Happened in Aden (1956)
 Une Parisienne (1957)
 The Roots of Heaven (1958)
 Women Are Like That (1960)
 Paris Blues (1961)
 Love Is a Ball (1963)
 Un monsieur de compagnie (Male Companion) (1964)
 Pleins feux sur Stanislas (1965)
 Les Rois maudits (1972) as Hugues de Bouville

References

External links
 
 

1892 births
1979 deaths
People from Fontenay-sous-Bois
French male film actors
French male silent film actors
French male stage actors
20th-century French male actors
Sociétaires of the Comédie-Française